Bernard Joseph Lukowich (born March 18, 1952) is a Canadian former NHL and WHA player. He played 79 games in the NHL for the Pittsburgh Penguins and the St. Louis Blues. And another 21 games for the Calgary Cowboys of the WHA.

His son is Brad Lukowich, who played in the NHL.

Career statistics

Regular season and playoffs

External links

1952 births
Calgary Cowboys players
Denver Spurs players
Estevan Bruins players
Ice hockey people from Saskatchewan
Living people
New Westminster Bruins players
Pittsburgh Penguins draft picks
Pittsburgh Penguins players
Sportspeople from North Battleford
St. Louis Blues players
Tidewater Sharks players
Canadian ice hockey right wingers